Berlin Edmond (born December 17, 1992), known online as Berleezy (stylized in all lowercase), is an American YouTuber and streamer. His YouTube channel first became popular in 2015 as a result of his Exposed series and later became focused on gaming content.

Life and career
Berlin Edmond was born on December 17, 1992. He created his YouTube channel in 2013. While attending California State University, Fullerton (CSUF), where he majored in English and was the president of the school's Black Student Union, Edmond found success on YouTube with Exposed, a series of videos in which he jokingly critiqued intros to children's animated series, after his tweet of a clip of him roasting the Hey Arnold! intro went viral in 2015. He soon graduated from CSUF and, in 2018, his channel reached one million subscribers.

Edmond created a gaming YouTube channel in 2016 and later became a popular video game streamer on Twitch. Tennis player Naomi Osaka debuted her Fortnite skin in a Twitch stream with Edmond in 2022. In early February 2023, Edmond's channel was briefly terminated, which fans believed to be in response to his gameplay video of the video game Poop Killer 4.

References

California State University, Fullerton alumni
Comedy YouTubers
Gaming YouTubers
American YouTubers
Twitch (service) streamers